The Nemili block is a revenue block in the Vellore district of Tamil Nadu, India. It has a total of 52 panchayat villages.

References
 

Revenue blocks of Vellore district